Andrea Giustiniani, O.P. (22 December 1572 – 27 November 1617) was a Catholic prelate who served as Bishop of Isola (1614–1617).

Biography
Andrea Giustiniani was born on 22 December 1572 in Ajaccio, France, and ordained a priest in the Order of Preachers.
On 24 November 1614, he was appointed during the papacy of Pope Paul V as Bishop of Isola.
On 30 November 1614, he was consecrated bishop by Giovanni Garzia Mellini, Cardinal-Priest of Santi Quattro Coronati, with Galeazzo Sanvitale, Archbishop Emeritus of Bari-Canosa, and Ulpiano Volpi, Archbishop of Chieti, serving as co-consecrators. 
He served as Bishop of Isola until his death on 27 November 1617.

References

External links and additional sources
 (for Chronology of Bishops) 
 (for Chronology of Bishops)  

17th-century Italian Roman Catholic bishops
People from Ajaccio
Bishops appointed by Pope Paul V
1572 births
1617 deaths